The 2014 Stadium Super Trucks Series was the second season of the Stadium Super Trucks and the first under the Speed Energy Formula Off-Road presented by Traxxas name.

As he did in 2013, series founder Robby Gordon was the winner of the series championship, taking six victories en route to the title. Gordon won the championship by 75 points ahead of Sheldon Creed, who won a trio of races during the year, including a clean sweep at the IndyCar Series-supporting event in Toronto. Third place in the championship went to Apdaly Lopez, who won two races during the season, at the X Games and at the Indianapolis Motor Speedway. E. J. Viso won the most races with the exception of Gordon, which included winning all three races at the Detroit Grand Prix, as part of a part-time season; Viso ultimately finished fifth in the championship. Keegan Kincaid (OC Fair) and P. J. Jones (St. Petersburg) were the only other winners during the 2014 season.

Drivers

Schedule

Season summary

The 2014 Speed Energy Formula Off-Road season began in March with the Stadium Super Trucks' inaugural trip to the Firestone Grand Prix of St. Petersburg. The first race was marred by a rain storm as Robby Gordon took the win, while P. J. Jones beat out Gordon in the second. Gordon won again at the following month's Toyota Grand Prix of Long Beach when he passed the battling Sheldon Creed and E. J. Viso for the victory. Viso, an IndyCar Series driver making his series debut, finished second after leading the most laps.

In May, the trucks raced at Indianapolis Motor Speedway as part of the Indianapolis 500's Carb Day. Known as the Menards at the Brickyard, the track layout featured part of the oval's frontstretch and the infield road course. Prior to the racing, Charles Dorrance's truck rolled through the grass after a poor ramp entry, leading to rib injuries. Gordon and Apdaly Lopez won the two races; Lopez, who finished second in the first round, claimed the overall weekend victory. The following week, SST joined the Chevrolet Detroit Belle Isle Grand Prix slate for the first time. Viso went on to sweep the weekend's three races as he off Arie Luyendyk Jr. in the first round, led the final three laps of the second, and survived a collision with Burt Jenner to hold the lead in the third.

Formula Off-Road's next stop was X Games Austin 2014 at Circuit of the Americas, a date that was scheduled in December 2013. A series-record 20 drivers entered the event. The field was split into two heats of ten drivers apiece, with the top eight advancing to the final; Justin Lofton and Gordon won the heats, while Dorrance, Nick Vanis, Greg Adler, and Jay Reichert failed to qualify. In the final, Bobby Runyan Jr. hit a jump with two wheels on lap four, sending his truck into a roll and triggering a red flag. At the restart, Lopez took the lead and maintained it to win the gold medal, with Creed and Gordon taking silver and bronze, respectively; Lopez became the first male Mexican X Games gold medalist. The X Games helped the trucks catch the attention of sports marketing firm The Elevation Group, whose president Denny Young decided to purchase a 40 percent stake in the series in September.

At Honda Indy Toronto, Creed swept the weekend. The first race saw a wet course due to rain, during which Creed moved through the field from the back as Scotty Steele led. The two eventually battled until Creed passed him. The second race, this time in dry conditions, featured a duel between Creed and Gordon that the former won.

From September 19–21, the series ran a weekend tripleheader in Southern California with dates at the OC Fair & Event Center and Naval Station North Island. The OC Fair races were part of the Sand Sports Super Show; SST was joined by support classes including off-road class 1440 trucks, motocross, trophy karts, and UTVs. Two heats for each final were held, with Viso and Gordon winning the first round's and Gordon and Lopez splitting the following day's. In the first final, pole sitter BJ Baldwin led the first half before he collided with Viso and fell off the pace, enabling Gordon to take the lead and win. Keegan Kincaid won the second final after catching up to Gordon when the latter began experiencing issues with his truck; Kincaid raced with Creed's No. 74 number plate, meaning the points scored by Kincaid went to Creed in the standings. On Sunday, the trucks joined the Coronado Speed Festival at NAS North Island, an event held to celebrate Fleet Week and also featured vintage racing; a vintage race was held between the Formula Off-Road heat race and final. Viso won the heat, while Gordon took advantage of the Joker Lap on a green flag restart to pull ahead and score the victory in the final.

The 2014 season finale took place at the MGM Resorts Village in Las Vegas, held in conjunction with SEMA. Viso led the first race of the weekend with Kincaid and Gordon in tow, but Viso retired after hitting a K rail. Gordon passed Kincaid after Viso's incident to take the lead and the eventual round victory; Burt Jenner finished third for his first career podium. In the final round, Creed and Gordon fought for the lead until the former cleared the latter late in the race. Although Creed won the race, he finished 75 points behind Gordon in the championship; Gordon ended the 2014 season with his second series title as he recorded six wins and 14 podiums.

Results and standings

Race results

Drivers' championship

Driver replacements

Notes

References

External links

 

Stadium Super Trucks
Stadium Super Trucks